Makhdan (also Romanized as Makhdān) is a village in Ahram Rural District, in the Central District of Tangestan County, Bushehr Province, Iran. At the 2006 census, its population was 35, in 10 families.

References 

Populated places in Tangestan County